The Macau Museum is located on the hill of the Fortaleza do Monte in Santo António, Macau, China. The museum presents the history of the city and territory of the former Portuguese colony of Macau, now a Special Administrative Region of the People's Republic of China.

Planning for the museum started in April 1995, its construction began in September 1996. The museum was inaugurated on 18 April 1998. The museum building is located within the interior of the Fortaleza do Monte. Its total size is about 2,800 m2, with around 2,100 m2 of exhibition space.

Gallery

See also
 List of museums in Macau

References

External links 

 Macau Museum website including information in English

Museums established in 1998
Museums in Macau
History museums in China
City museums
1998 establishments in Macau